Styles of Radical Will is a collection of essays by Susan Sontag published in 1969. Among the subjects discussed are film, literature, politics, and pornography. It is Sontag's second collection of non-fiction. Her first nonfiction book is Against Interpretation and Other Personal Essays, which was published in 1966.

Reception
Lawrence M. Bensky of The New York Times praised Styles of Radical Will as an "important book" and wrote, "It should be remembered that Miss Sontag has now written four of the most valuable intellectual documents of the past 10 years: 'Against Interpretation,' 'Notes on 'Camp',' 'The Aesthetics of Silence,' and 'Trip to Hanoi.' In the world in which she's chosen to live, she continues to be the best there is."

References

External links
 Susan Sontag Website

1969 non-fiction books
American essay collections
English-language books
Farrar, Straus and Giroux books
Works by Susan Sontag